Gerri Cannon is an American politician, who was elected in 2018 to the New Hampshire House of Representatives. She represents the Strafford 18th District as a member of the Democratic Party. She was previously (in 2017) elected to the Somersworth, New Hampshire School Board.

Cannon is transgender, and she and Lisa Bunker were elected alongside each other as the state's first openly transgender state legislators.

References

Living people
People from Somersworth, New Hampshire
Democratic Party members of the New Hampshire House of Representatives
LGBT state legislators in New Hampshire
Transgender politicians
Transgender women
School board members in New Hampshire
21st-century American politicians
21st-century American women politicians
Women state legislators in New Hampshire
Year of birth missing (living people)